Swedish Patriotism is an 1819 stage melodrama by the British writer and actor William Abbot. It premiered at the Theatre Royal, Covent Garden on 19 May 1819.  The London cast included Daniel Terry as Colonel Walstein, Abbot as Captain Albert, Maria Foote as Ulrica, John Liston as Walter, Charles Connor as Colonel Langstorff and Daniel Egerton as Count Cronstedt. It then appeared at the Park Theatre in New York on 1 December 1819 with Robert Maywood as Walstein.

Synopsis
The play is set in Gotland during the reign of Gustavus Adolphus, where Swedish Colonel Walstein leads a patriotic uprising against Danish forces.

References

Bibliography
 Greene, John C. Theatre in Dublin, 1745-1820: A Calendar of Performances, Volume 6. Lexington Books, 2011.
 Nicoll, Allardyce. A History of Early Nineteenth Century Drama 1800-1850. Cambridge University Press, 1930.

1819 plays
West End plays
British plays
Plays set in Sweden
Historical plays
Plays set in the 17th century